Attorney General Warner may refer to:

Aucher Warner (1859–1944), Attorney-General of Trinidad and Tobago
Joseph E. Warner (Massachusetts politician) (1884–1958), Attorney General of Massachusetts

See also
General Warner (disambiguation)